The 1990 Western Athletic Conference men's basketball tournament was held March 7–10 at the Special Events Center at the University of Texas at El Paso in El Paso, Texas.

UTEP defeated  in the championship game, 75–58, to clinch their fourth overall, and second consecutive, WAC men's tournament championship

The Miners, in turn, received an automatic bid to the 1990 NCAA tournament. They were joined in the tournament by the WAC regular season co-champions Colorado State and BYU, who both earned at-large bids (both teams lost their WAC quarterfinal games to lower seeds).

Format
The tournament field remained fixed at nine teams, and teams were again seeded based on regular season conference records. All teams were entered into the quarterfinal round with the exception of the two lowest-seeded teams, who played in the preliminary first round to determine who would then play against the tournament's top seed.

Bracket

References

WAC men's basketball tournament
Tournament
WAC men's basketball tournament
WAC men's basketball tournament
Basketball competitions in El Paso, Texas
College basketball tournaments in Texas